Bagni San Filippo is an area in the municipality of Castiglione d'Orcia in the Province of Siena, Italy, not far from Monte Amiata. It is a small hot spring containing calcium carbonate deposits, which form white concretions and waterfalls. The name derives from that of St Philip Benizi, who was a prior of the Servite order, and who lived as a hermit here in the thirteenth century. The grotto is open to visitors.

External links

 Bagni San Filippo  The website contains info about Bagni San Filippo Thermal SPA and more
 bagnisanfilippo.eu  The best website for Bagni San Filippo -Tourism - SPA - Hotels - Restaurants - Map - Info - links- weather forecast 
 Official Tourism site for Bagni San Filippo
 Tourism in San Filippo

Frazioni of Castiglione d'Orcia
Hot springs of Italy